The lesser house fly or little house fly, Fannia canicularis, is somewhat smaller than the common housefly. It is best known for its habit of entering buildings and flying in jagged patterns in the middle of a room. It is slender, and the median vein in the wing is straight. Larvae feed on all manner of decaying organic matter, including carrion.

Morphology 
Fannia canicularis is a slim fly reaching a length of from 4 to 6 mm. The white-bordered eyes meet above in the male, a condition described as holoptic. In females, the eyes do not meet. The brown-grey thorax has three black, longitudinal stripes in the males. These are much less distinct in the female. The first two segments of the abdomen are translucently yellow with a dark-brown basal colour. The dark trapezoid marks of the males are hardly recognizable in  the females. The halteres are yellowish.

Development 
The females lay their eggs in batches of up to 50 and may lay up to 2,000 eggs altogether. The eggs, which are white with a pair of dorsal longitudinal flanges or wings, can float in liquid and semiliquid decaying organic matter, especially poultry, cow and dog feces, kitchen waste such as the end of putrid potatoes or carrots, silage and compost, cheese, bacon, and drying fish. They are commonly found in garbage depots, wheelie bins, garbage trucks, and other places where food waste is stored. The eggs hatch after only two days (24 to 48 hours at ) and the larvae require six or more days to reach pupation, which lasts seven or more days, so they usually take about 2–4 wk to develop into adults, depending upon temperature. The cycle repeats in very damp, putrid excrement, liquid manure, etc.

Behaviour 
Fannia canicularis is spread worldwide. They have a life expectancy of two to three weeks. In Central Europe, about seven generations can develop per year. They are often found on excrement and on vertebrate animals. Because of their oscillating between excrement and human food, they are considered possible disease carriers. From May to October, the lesser housefly comes frequently into buildings and is noticeable by its peculiar, silent flight in the room center, where it circles down-hanging articles, particularly lamps. It changes the flight direction jerkily. This is a patrol flight, in which the males supervise, if necessary, their district and attack intruders. During short breaks and in the night hours, the flies sit on lamps or on walls and leave their small excrement marks. In the wild, tree branches serve the flies for their swarm dances.

References

.
.

Diptera of Europe
Fanniidae
Insects described in 1761
Taxa named by Carl Linnaeus